Passport to Eternity is a collection of science fiction short stories by British writer J. G. Ballard.

Contents
"The Man on the 99th Floor"
"Thirteen to Centaurus"
"Track 12"
"The Watch Towers"
"A Question of Re-Entry"
"Escapement"
"The Thousand Dreams of Stellavista"
"The Cage of Sand"
"Passport to Eternity"

References

External links

The Terminal Collection: JG Ballard First Editions

1963 short story collections
Short story collections by J. G. Ballard
Berkley Books books